A Mars landing is a landing of a spacecraft on the surface of Mars. Of multiple attempted Mars landings by robotic, uncrewed spacecraft, ten have had successful soft landings. There have also been studies for a possible human mission to Mars, including a landing, but none have been attempted. Soviet Union’s Mars 3, which landed in 1971, was the first successful Mars landing. As of 2022, the Soviet Union, United States, and China have conducted Mars landings successfully.

Methods of descent and landing
As of 2021, all methods of landing on Mars have used an aeroshell and parachute sequence for Mars atmospheric entry and descent, but after the parachute is detached, there are three options. A stationary lander can drop from the parachute back shell and ride retrorockets all the way down, but a rover cannot be burdened with rockets that serve no purpose after touchdown. 
 
One method for lighter rovers is to enclose the rover in a tetrahedral structure which in turn is enclosed in airbags. After the aeroshell drops off, the tetrahedron is lowered clear of the parachute back shell on a tether so that the airbags can inflate. Retrorockets on the back shell can slow descent. When it nears the ground, the tetrahedron is released to drop to the ground, using the airbags as shock absorbers. When it has come to rest, the tetrahedron opens to expose the rover.

If a rover is too heavy to use airbags, the retrorockets can be mounted on a sky crane. The sky crane drops from the parachute back shell and, as it nears the ground, the rover is lowered on a tether. When the rover touches ground, it cuts the tether so that the sky crane (with its rockets still firing) will crash well away from the rover.

Descent of heavier payloads

For landers that are even heavier than the Curiosity rover (which required a 4.5 meter (15 feet) diameter aeroshell), engineers are developing a combination rigid-inflatable Low-Density Supersonic Decelerator that could be 8 meters (28 feet) in diameter. It would have to be accompanied by a proportionately larger parachute.

Landing challenges 
Landing robotic spacecraft, and possibly some day humans, on Mars is a technological challenge. For a favorable landing, the lander module has to address these issues:

 Thinness of Mars's atmosphere
 Measurement of distance to surface
 Inadequate technology for ballistic aerocapture
 Inadequate technology for retropropulsive powered descent
 Inadequate mission designs 
 Shorter time to perform entry, descent and landing (EDL)

In 2018, NASA successfully landed the InSight lander on the surface of Mars, re-using Viking-era technology. But this technology cannot afford the ability to land large number of cargoes, habitats, ascent vehicles and humans in case of crewed Mars missions in near future. In order to improve and accomplish this intent, there is need to upgrade technologies and launch vehicles. For a successive soft-landing using current technology, some of the considerable factors for a lander such as:

 Mass should be less than 
 Ballistic coefficient should be less than 
 Diameter of the aeroshell should be less than 
 Geometry of the aeroshell should be 70° spherical cone shell
 Diameter of the parachute should be less than 
 Need to use supersonic retropropulsive powered descent
 Need to perform orbital entry (i.e., entry from Mars orbit)

Communicating with Earth
Beginning with the Viking program, all landers on the surface of Mars have used orbiting spacecraft as communications satellites for relaying their data to Earth. The landers use UHF transmitters to send their data to the orbiters, which then relay the data to Earth using either X band or Ka band frequencies. These higher frequencies, along with more powerful transmitters and larger antennas, permit the orbiters to send the data much faster than the landers could manage transmitting directly to Earth, which conserves valuable time on the receiving antennas.

List of Mars landings

In the 1970s, several USSR probes unsuccessfully tried to land on Mars. Mars 3 landed successfully in 1971 but failed shortly thereafter. The American Viking landers however made it to the surface and provided several years of images and data. However, there was not another successful Mars landing until 1997, when Mars Pathfinder landed. In the 21st century there have been several successful landings, but there have also been many crashes.

Mars probe program

The first probe intended to be a Mars impact lander was the Soviet Mars 1962B, unsuccessfully launched in 1962.

In 1970 the Soviet Union began the design of Mars 4NM and Mars 5NM missions with super-heavy uncrewed Martian spacecraft. First was Marsokhod, with a planned date of early 1973, and second was the Mars sample return mission planned for 1975. Both spacecraft were intended to be launched on the N1 rocket, but this rocket never flew successfully and the Mars 4NM and Mars 5NM projects were cancelled.

In 1971 the Soviet Union sent probes Mars 2 and Mars 3, each carrying a lander, as part of the Mars probe program M-71. The Mars 2 lander failed to land and impacted Mars. The Mars 3 lander became the first probe to successfully soft-land on Mars, but its data-gathering had less success. The lander began transmitting to the Mars 3 orbiter 90 seconds after landing, but after 14.5 seconds, transmission ceased for unknown reasons. The cause of the failure may have been related to the extremely powerful Martian dust storm taking place at the time. These space probes each contained a Mars rover although they were never deployed.

In 1973, the Soviet Union sent two more landers to Mars, Mars 6 and Mars 7. The Mars 6 lander transmitted data during descent but failed upon impact.

The double-launching Mars 5M (Mars-79) sample return mission was planned for 1979, but was cancelled due to complexity and technical problems.

Viking program

In 1976 two American Viking probes entered orbit about Mars and each released a lander module that made a successful soft landing on the planet's surface. They subsequently had the first successful transmission of large volumes of data, including the first color pictures and extensive scientific information. Seasonal dust storms, pressure changes, and movement of atmospheric gases between the polar caps were observed. A biology experiment produced possible evidence of life, but it was not corroborated by other on-board experiments.

While searching for a suitable landing spot for Viking 2s lander, the Viking 1 orbiter photographed the landform that constitutes the so-called "Face on Mars" on 25 July 1976.

The Viking program was a descendant of the cancelled Voyager program, whose name was later reused for a pair of outer solar system probes.

Mars Pathfinder

NASA's Mars Pathfinder spacecraft, with assistance from the Mars Global Surveyor orbiter, landed on 4 July 1997. Its landing site was an ancient flood plain in Mars' northern hemisphere called Ares Vallis, which is among the rockiest parts of Mars. It carried a tiny remote-controlled rover called Sojourner, the first successful Mars rover, that traveled a few meters around the landing site, exploring the conditions and sampling rocks around it. Newspapers around the world carried images of the lander dispatching the rover to explore the surface of Mars in a way never achieved before.

Until the final data transmission on 27 September 1997, Mars Pathfinder returned 16,500 images from the lander and 550 images from the rover, as well as more than 15 chemical analyses of rocks and soil and extensive data on winds and other weather factors. Findings from the investigations carried out by scientific instruments on both the lander and the rover suggest that in the past Mars has been warm and wet, with liquid water and a thicker atmosphere. The mission website was the most heavily trafficked up to that time.

Spate of failures

Mars 96, an orbiter launched on 16 November 1996 by Russia, failed when the planned second burn of the Block D-2 fourth stage did not occur. Following the success of Global Surveyor and Pathfinder, another spate of failures occurred in 1998 and 1999, with the Japanese Nozomi orbiter and NASA's Mars Climate Orbiter, Mars Polar Lander, and Deep Space 2 penetrators all suffering various terminal errors. Mars Climate Orbiter is infamous for Lockheed Martin engineers mixing up the usage of U.S. customary units with metric units, causing the orbiter to burn up while entering Mars's atmosphere. Out of 5–6 NASA missions in the 1990s, only 2 worked: Mars Pathfinder and Mars Global Surveyor, making Mars Pathfinder and its rover the only successful Mars landing in the 1990s.

Mars Express and Beagle 2

On 2 June 2003, the European Space Agency's Mars Express set off from Baikonur Cosmodrome to Mars. The Mars Express craft consisted of the Mars Express Orbiter and the lander Beagle 2. Although the landing probe was not designed to move, it carried a digging device and the least massive spectrometer created to date, as well as a range of other devices, on a robotic arm in order to accurately analyse soil beneath the dusty surface.

The orbiter entered Mars orbit on 25 December 2003, and Beagle 2 should have entered Mars' atmosphere the same day. However, attempts to contact the lander failed. Communications attempts continued throughout January, but Beagle 2 was declared lost in mid-February, and a joint inquiry was launched by the UK and ESA that blamed principal investigator Colin Pillinger's poor project management. Nevertheless, Mars Express Orbiter confirmed the presence of water ice and carbon dioxide ice at the planet's south pole. NASA had previously confirmed their presence at the north pole of Mars.

Signs of the Beagle 2 lander were found in 2013 by the HiRISE camera on NASA's Mars Reconnaissance Orbiter, and the Beagle 2s presence was confirmed in January 2015, several months after Pillinger's death. The lander appears to have successfully landed but not deployed all of its power and communications panels.

Mars Exploration Rovers

Shortly after the launch of Mars Express, NASA sent a pair of twin rovers toward the planet as part of the Mars Exploration Rover mission. On 10 June 2003, NASA's MER-A (Spirit) Mars Exploration Rover was launched. It successfully landed in Gusev Crater (believed once to have been a crater lake) on 3 January 2004. It examined rock and soil for evidence of the area's history of water. On 7 July 2003, a second rover, MER-B (Opportunity) was launched. It landed on 24 January 2004 in Meridiani Planum (where there are large deposits of hematite, indicating the presence of past water) to carry out similar geological work.

Despite a temporary loss of communication with the Spirit rover (caused by a file system anomaly) delaying exploration for several days, both rovers eventually began exploring their landing sites. The rover Opportunity landed in a particularly interesting spot, a crater with bedrock outcroppings. In fast succession, mission team members announced on 2 March that data returned from the rover showed that these rocks were once "drenched in water", and on 23 March that it was concluded that they were laid down underwater in a salty sea. This represented the first strong direct evidence for liquid water on Mars at some time in the past.

Towards the end of July 2005, it was reported by the Sunday Times that the rovers may have carried the bacteria Bacillus safensis to Mars. According to one NASA microbiologist, this bacteria could survive both the trip and conditions on Mars. Despite efforts to sterilise both landers, neither could be assured to be completely sterile.

Having been designed for only three-month missions, both rovers lasted much longer than planned. Spirit lost contact with Earth in March 2010, 74 months after commencing exploration. Opportunity, however, continued to carry out surveys of the planet, surpassing  on its odometer by the time communication with it was lost in June 2018, 173 months after it began. These rovers have discovered many new things, including Heat Shield Rock, the first meteorite to be discovered on another planet.

Phoenix

Phoenix launched on 4 August 2007, and touched down on the northern polar region of Mars on 25 May 2008. It is famous for having been successfully photographed while landing, since this was the first time one spacecraft captured the landing of another spacecraft onto a planet.

Mars Science Laboratory

The Mars Science Laboratory (MSL) (and Curiosity rover), launched in November 2011, landed in a location that is now called "Bradbury Landing", on Aeolis Palus, between Peace Vallis and Aeolis Mons ("Mount Sharp"), in Gale Crater on Mars on 6 August 2012, 05:17 UTC. The landing site was in Quad 51 ("Yellowknife") of Aeolis Palus near the base of Aeolis Mons. NASA named the landing site "Bradbury Landing", in honor of author Ray Bradbury, on 22 August 2012.

ExoMars Schiaparelli
 

The Schiaparelli lander was intended to test technology for future soft landings on the surface of Mars as part of the ExoMars project. It was built in Italy by the European Space Agency (ESA) and Roscosmos. It was launched together with the ExoMars Trace Gas Orbiter (TGO) on 14 March 2016 and attempted a landing on 19 October 2016. Telemetry was lost about one minute before the scheduled landing time, but confirmed that most elements of the landing plan, including heat shield operation, parachute deployment, and rocket activation, had been successful. The Mars Reconnaissance Orbiter later captured imagery showing what appears to be Schiaparelli's crash site.

InSight

NASA's InSight lander, designed to study seismology and heat flow from the deep interior of Mars, was launched on 5 May 2018. It landed successfully in Mars's Elysium Planitia on 26 November 2018.

Mars 2020 and Tianwen-1 
NASA's Mars 2020 and CNSA's Tianwen-1 were both launched in the July 2020 window. Mars 2020's rover Perseverance successfully landed, in a location that is now called "Octavia E. Butler Landing", in Jezero Crater on 18 February 2021, Ingenuity helicopter was deployed and took subsequent flights in April. Tianwen-1's lander and Zhurong rover landed in Utopia Planitia on 14 May 2021 with the rover being deployed on 22 May, 2021 and dropping a remote selfie camera on 1 June, 2021.

Future missions
The ESA Rosalind Franklin is planned for launch in the late 2020s and would obtain soil samples from up to  depth and make an extensive search for biosignatures and biomolecules. There is also a proposal for a Mars Sample Return Mission by ESA and NASA, which would launch in 2024 or later. This mission would be part of the European Aurora Programme.

The Indian Space Research Organisation has proposed to include landing of a rover in its third Mars mission around 2030 near Eridania basin.

Landing site identification
As a Mars lander approaches the surface, identifying a safe landing spot is a concern.

See also

 Colonization of Mars 
 Exploration of Mars
 Google Mars 
 Human mission to Mars
 List of missions to Mars
 Mars race
 Mars rover 
 Space weather

Notes

References

External links
Table of the distances between various landers and landmarks

Exploration of Mars